The Ynares Sports Arena is an indoor arena located in Pasig, Philippines. The stadium has hosted the basketball games of the Philippine Basketball Association, Philippine Basketball League, and Maharlika Pilipinas Basketball League, as well as college basketball tournaments. The arena was built in the former location of Rizal's provincial capitol.

It was the primary home venue of the ASEAN Basketball League (ABL) teams Philippine Patriots and the San Miguel Beermen. The Beermen notably lost the deciding game of the 2012 ABL Finals to the Indonesia Warriors in the arena.

It has hosted games of the UNTV Cup and it is currently the home arena of the Pasig Sta. Lucia Realtors of Maharlika Pilipinas Basketball League.

The Philippine Basketball Association was meant to play exclusively in the arena during the 2021 PBA Philippine Cup due to COVID-19 restrictions. However, when Metro Manila, where Pasig is a part of, was put in a more restricted quarantine, games were transferred to a venue outside of Metro Manila.

Notable events at Ynares Sports Arena

 Philippine Collegiate Champions League (2008, 2013, 2014, 2018, 2019)
 Star Factor finale (2010) 
 ASEAN Basketball League (2009–10, 2011, 2012; home courts of the AirAsia Philippine Patriots and San Miguel Beermen)
 The Biggest Loser Pinoy Edition 1st season finale (2011)
 PBA Developmental League (2013 Foundation Cup, 2016 Foundation Cup, 2016 Aspirants' Cup, 2017 Asiprants' Cup, 2018 Foundation Cup, 2018 Aspirants' Cup, 2019 Aspirants', 2020 Aspirants')   
 Philippine Super Liga (2013 Grand Prix, 2018 Grand Prix, 2018 Collegiate Grand Slam, 2018 Invitational, 2019 Grand Prix, 2019 Invitational)
 Icons of PInoy Rock concert (2015)
 UNTV Cup (Seasons 1, 2, 3, 4)
 Maharlika Pilipinas Basketball League (2018–19; home court of the Makati Super Crunch)
 Spikers' Turf (2nd Season 2nd Conference)
 Philippine Basketball Association (2021 Philippine Cup)

Upcoming events
 Premier Volleyball League

References

External links

Pasig official website

Sports venues in Metro Manila
ASEAN Basketball League venues
Basketball venues in the Philippines
Indoor arenas in the Philippines
Buildings and structures in Pasig
Sports venues completed in 2008